Events from the year 1915 in Denmark.

Incumbents
 Monarch – Christian X
 Prime minister – Carl Theodor Zahle

Events

 7 May – A Folketing election is held. As required to change the Constitution, the government called for the dissolution of both the Folketing and the Landsting in order for the new Rigsdag to be able to introduce the new constitution.
 5 June – Women's suffrage is introduced in Denmark, women are given the right to vote in Rigsdag elections.
 27 June – Bedre Byggeskik, a late Danish incarnation of the Arts and Crafts Movement, is founded at a meeting in Odense as a reaction against the impoverished state of Danish architecture which they found to be a consequence of the Historicist style which had dominated the past decades.

Sports
 February  Boldklubben Skjold is founded.

Births
 26 August – Niels Macholm, painter and graphic artist (died in 1997)
 21 September – Hanne Budtz, politician and lawyer (died 2004)
 12 December – Tobias Faber, architect (died 2010)

Deaths
 13 January – Barclay Raunkiær, Arabia explorer, author (born 1889)
 11 March – Vilhelm Rosenstand, artist (born 1838)
 8 September – Julius Villiam Gudmand-Høyer, author (born 1841)
 11 September – Jens Birkholm, genre and landscape painter associated with the Funen Painters (born 1869)

References

 
Denmark
Years of the 20th century in Denmark
1910s in Denmark
Denmark